Glenada is an ex-Canadian navy tugboat that was launched in 1943. Glenada was built by Russel Brothers Limited in Owen Sound, Ontario. It is one of twenty 1943 Glen-class tugs, eleven of which were built by the Russel Brothers Company. When it served for the Royal Canadian Navy the official number for this boat was (W30) 177886 and the Canadian Navy number was 534.  The Glen-class tugs were made in two designs (designated "A" and "B"); Glenada is an "A" design, with a longer main deck house, extending aft over the engine room, and uniform height bulwarks from forward to aft. A lifeboat is mounted on the bridgedeck aft of the stack. Glenada was originally powered by one Vivian  8-cylinder diesel ( with supercharger).

After it was decommissioned from the navy it was registered in Montreal in 1956, and used by Sandrin Bros. in Sarnia, Ontario until 1995 when it was purchased by Thunder Bay Tug Services who still owns/runs it in Lake Superior.

In 1977 Glenada was widened  on each side. In 1977 the main engine suffered serious damage while assisting a ship named Hilda Marjanne in the St. Clair River. This led to the engine was being swapped out for a Caterpillar D399 V16 turbo-charged diesel engine that produces  at 1200 RPM. The tug has two generators, a Detroit Diesel 3-71 generator and a John Deere 4-cylinder diesel generator.

Service history
Glenada and its crew were on hand to assist in the 1996 rescue of a cruise ship named Grampa Woo that had broken free from its dock while undergoing repairs.  At the time of the incident, Grampa Woo had no propulsion capability, and was adrift. The Medal of Bravery was awarded to Captain Gerry Dawson, M.B. and Engineer John E. Olson, M.B.,while deckhand James Harding, received the Star of Courage on 10 May 1999.

Glenada rescued a fishing vessel on 7 April 2007. Glenada is on display once a year at the Thunder Bay River Fest, alongside the historical James Whalen tugboat and the TBay Coast Guard boat.

See also

References

 Joan Skelton "Rescue From Grampa Woo" book

1943 ships
Auxiliary ships of the Royal Canadian Navy
Tugboats of Canada
Tugboats on the Great Lakes
Ships built in Ontario